Barranco Minas Airport  is an airport serving the river town of Barranco Minas in the Guainía Department of Colombia.

The runway is adjacent to the Guaviare River and has  of grass overrun available on its east end.

See also

Transport in Colombia
List of airports in Colombia

References

External links
OpenStreetMap - Barranco Minas
OurAirports - Barranco Minas
FallingRain - Barranco Minas Airport

Airports in Colombia